Equestrian at the 2018 Summer Youth Olympics was held from 8 to 13 October 2018 at the Argentine Equestrian Club in Buenos Aires, Argentina.

Qualification

Each National Olympic Committee (NOC) can enter a maximum of 1 athlete. Athletes will qualify into one of six zones (Europe, North America, South America, Asia, Australasia and Africa) containing five athletes. As hosts, Argentina was automatically given a rider and up to 6 spots were available to the Tripartite Commission, though not all were used; this will cause a reduction from the zone quota depending which zone the chosen athlete is from. The remaining places will decided from qualification events or the 2017 FEI World Jumping Challenge (Category A) rankings. Should a zone not have enough athletes, the spot will filled by athletes from another zone.

To be eligible to participate at the Youth Olympics athletes must have been born between 1 January 2000 and 31 December 2003. Furthermore, all riders must have obtained a Certificate of Capability. The certificate must be obtained between 1 April 2017 and 31 May 2018 at a registered event.

Medal summary

Medal table

Events

References

External links
Official Results Book – Equestrian

 
Equestrian
2018
Youth Summer Olympics
Equestrian sports in Argentina